No Smoking Day is an annual health awareness day in the United Kingdom which is intended to help smokers who want to quit smoking.  The first No Smoking Day was on Ash Wednesday in 1984, and it now takes place on the second Wednesday in March.

Each year, the campaign is promoted with a theme in the form of a short phrase.  In 2010, this theme was "Break free", encouraging smokers to break free from the chains of cigarettes and quit on No Smoking Day. The 2011 theme was "Time to quit?".  Research conducted by GfK NOP following the 2009 campaign found that 1 in 10 smokers quit on No Smoking Day.

The campaign was run by a charity of the same name, based in London with four full-time staff, until this was merged with the British Heart Foundation in 2011. It is funded by a coalition of governmental and voluntary sector organizations, with an interest in health.  No Smoking Day's most recent President was entrepreneur, TV personality, and anti-tobacco campaigner Duncan Bannatyne OBE. Bannatyne is an ex-smoker who publicly took on British American Tobacco at its AGM in April 2008.

See also
World No Tobacco Day
World AIDS Day
World Cancer Day

References

External links
No Smoking Day

Health awareness days
Smoking in the United Kingdom
March observances
Wednesday observances
Observances in the United Kingdom
Holidays and observances by scheduling (nth weekday of the month)
Tobacco control